Mandja may refer to:

Mandja language
Mandja people

See also
Manja (disambiguation)